Call Me Anna is a 1990 American made-for-television biographical drama film directed by Gilbert Cates and written by John McGreevey. It is based on the 1988 book Call Me Anna by Patty Duke and Kenneth Turan. The film stars Patty Duke, Timothy Carhart, Howard Hesseman, Deborah May, Ari Meyers and Millie Perkins. The film premiered on ABC on November 11, 1990.

Plot

Cast 
Patty Duke as Anna Marie Duke
Ari Meyers as Patty Duke (youth)
Jenny Robertson as Patty Duke (young adult)
Arthur Taxier as John Astin
Howard Hesseman as John Ross
Deborah May as Ethel Ross
Millie Perkins as Frances Duke
Timothy Carhart as Harry Falk
Matthew Perry as Desi Arnaz Jr.
David Packer as Glenn Bell (pseudonym for Michael Tell)
Karl Malden as Dr. Harold Arlen
Woody Eney as Fred Coe
Dana Gladstone as Fred Maxwell
François Giroday as Bob McLaren
Lora Staley as Anne Bancroft
Ray Duke as John Patrick Duke
Glenn Quinn as George Chakiris
Cory Danziger as Sean Astin
Zachary Benjamin as Sean Astin (young)
Ryan Francis as Mackie Astin
Matthew Linville as Mackie Astin (young)
Paige Gosney as Billy
Seth Isler as Game Show Producer
Nicholas Hormann as Game Show Host
Richard Fancy as Contract Lawyer

References

External links
 

1990 television films
1990 films
1990 drama films
1990s biographical drama films
American drama films
American biographical drama films
Biographical films about actors
Films based on biographies
Drama films based on actual events
Biographical television films
Films set in the 1950s
Films set in the 1960s
Films set in the 1970s
Films set in the 1980s
Films directed by Gilbert Cates
Cultural depictions of actors
1990s English-language films
1990s American films